Sam Sweeney (born 27 February 1989 in Nottingham) is a multi-instrumental English folk musician.

Career
Sweeney was introduced to folk music as a child via his parents' record collection and taught himself to play traditional pieces by ear. He started playing the fiddle at age six, and first performed as a soloist at folk festivals in 2001. From 2002 to 2010, he was part of the East Midlands-based folk band Kerfuffle, playing fiddle, viola, and cajon, and singing. When Kerfuffle disbanded, Sweeney continued playing with accordion player and singer Hannah James as the duo Hannah James and Sam Sweeney. 

From 2008 to 2016, he became a member of the award-winning eleven-piece folk band Bellowhead, playing fiddle and English bagpipes, as a replacement for former member Giles Lewin. Sweeney played with Bellowhead until their final gig in May 2016 at Oxford Town Hall.

He has toured with Jon Boden and the Remnant Kings, playing both drums and fiddle, sometimes simultaneously.
He is also a member of Fay Hield's band, originally named the Fay Hield Trio but as of 2012 called Fay Hield & The Hurricane Party, and took part in The Full English album and tour in 2013.

Together with Andy Cutting and Rob Harbron, he formed English folk supergroup Leveret in 2015.

Sweeney helped set up the UK's National Youth Folk Ensemble, an EFDSS programme that introduces young people to folk music through schools, community settings and residential courses. He was appointed inaugural Artistic Director of the Ensemble in 2015.

In 2018, he started his solo career with the album The Unfinished Violin. Two years later in 2020, he followed it with his second album Unearth Repeat. Then, he released an album called Escape That in 2022. That album was used as support to Bellowhead reuniting for a November 2022 tour for the tenth anniversary of the band's album Broadside. He also played alongside his Bellowhead bandmates during the tour. The band decided to reunite after doing a virtual concert during the Covid-19 pandemic.

Awards

Sweeney has won a number of awards including the 'In The Tradition' award and the 'Wiltshire Folk Association Young Folk Award', which he won for two years in succession. He was also a nominated in the 2004 BBC Young Folk Awards. In 2007 he won one of five BBC Performing Arts Fund bursaries to help him start his musical career. Sweeney was nominated for the 'Musician of the Year' award at the 2013 BBC Radio 2 Folk Awards and won this award at the 2015 BBC Radio 2 Folk Awards.
His album Unearth Repeat was voted "Album of the Year" for 2020 by Bright Young Folk readers with almost the 36% of the votes.

Discography

References

External links

Living people
1989 births
English folk musicians
People from Nottingham
People educated at Loughborough Grammar School
Bellowhead members
The Full English members